Megachile cockerelli is a species of bee in the family Megachilidae. It was described by Rohwer in 1923.

References

Cockerelli
Insects described in 1923